Zygmunt Konieczny (19 April 1927 – 7 July 2003) was a Polish bobsledder who competed in the 1956 Winter Olympics. He was born in Leszno.

References

1927 births
2003 deaths
People from Leszno
Polish male bobsledders
Olympic bobsledders of Poland
Bobsledders at the 1956 Winter Olympics